Port Cities is a Canadian band based in Halifax, Nova Scotia. Formed in 2015, Port Cities is composed of Dylan Guthro, Breagh MacKinnon, and Carleton Stone —each already a singer/songwriter with an established solo career. The band signed with turtlemusik/Warner Music in 2016 and released its debut album in 2017.

History

Guthro, Mackinnon, and Stone met in 2011 at the Gordie Sampson Song Camp, an annual event in Cape Breton that gathers promising songwriters from across Nova Scotia. There they formed a three-way friendship that soon led to various collaborations in the context of their individual musical lives. Eventually they were writing and playing together often enough that the idea of forming a band arose naturally.

"We just thought, there’s such a great chemistry between us, why not try to join forces and do something that’s bigger that any of us could do on our own?” said Carelton Stone in a 2015 interview.

Port Cities officially launched in 2015. In 2016, the band was signed to turtlemusik/Warner Music; their debut album was released in February 2017.

As individual musicians, the three members of Port Cities had collectively released six solo albums prior to the band's first release. As a group they write songs to take advantage of each member's strength and experience as a vocalist, often employing two- and three-part harmonies in their music.

In 2016, Port Cities won Casino Nova Scotia's third annual Artist in Residence competition, which awarded them $20,000 to assist them in their ongoing musical development.

Also in 2016, the band released its first two songs, "Astronaut" and "Back to the Bottom." The debut album, produced by Gordie Sampson, was released February 10, 2017. On February 23, 2017, their debut single "Back to the Bottom" reached #1 on CBC Radio 2. That same year, Port Cities took the lead at the 2017 Nova Scotia Music Awards, winning five, including Entertainer of the Year, Digital Artist of the Year, Group Recording of the Year, Pop Recording of the Year, and Recording of the Year.

In February 2018, Port Cities released their single “Idea of You”. That spring, they toured across Canada, as well as Germany and the United Kingdom.

Port Cities were among the 2018/2019 Allan Slaight Juno Masterclass Winners, Canada’s premiere artist development program selected by a “super-jury” of music industry leaders, allowing them to transform their careers with crucial tools and invaluable experiences. Of the four master class participants, Port Cities was chosen to perform at the 2019 Juno Gala Dinner and Awards on March 16.

Their most recent single is titled “Montreal”.

On Friday, September 20, 2019, the band stated keyboardist and singer Breagh MacKinnon of Port Cities would be leaving to pursue “new creative opportunities” and that they would miss her. The three original band members are set to release one final song together in October 2019 and will have three final shows with MacKinnon in December 2019. Guthro and Stone have confirmed that they will be continuing as a band under the name Port Cities and that they would be taking the fall to decide how to best move forward.

Band members
 Breagh MacKinnon (vocals, keyboards) (2015-2019)
 Dylan Guthro (vocals, guitar, programming)
 Carleton Stone (vocals, guitar)

Discography

Albums
 "Port Cities" (2017)

Singles
"Sorry" (2019)
"Montreal" Famba Remix (2019)
"Montreal" Tep No Remix (2019)
"Montreal" (2018)
"Half The Way" Germany Mix" (2018)
"Idea Of You" Corey Lerue Remix (2018)
"Idea Of You" (2018)
"Where Have You Been" (Acoustic) (2017)
"Sound Of Your Voice" Tawgs Remix (2017)
"Back To The Bottom" Neon Dreams Remix (2017)

Awards and achievements

2019
 Music Nova Scotia Award Nomination - Digital Artist of the Year
 Music Nova Scotia Award Nomination - Songwriter of the Year - "Montreal" (Dylan Guthro, Breagh MacKinnon, Carleton Stone, Thomas Salter)
2018
 Slaight Music Juno Masterclass Winners
 Voted The Coast “Best of Halifax” - Best Folk Artist/Band (Gold)
 Voted The Coast “Best of Halifax” - Best Pop Artist/Band (Silver)
 Music Nova Scotia Award Nomination - Digital Artist of the Year
 ECMA Award Nomination - Pop Recording of the Year – Port Cities, Port Cities
 ECMA Award Nomination - Song of the Year – Port Cities, “Back To The Bottom”
 ECMA Award Nomination - Fans’ Choice Entertainer of the Year – Port Cities
2017
 CBC Radio 2 2017 Charts Most Online Votes - #14 “In The Dark”
 CBC Radio 2 2017 Charts #1 songs of 2017 - #14 “Back to the Bottom”
 Music Nova Scotia Award Winner Best Album - "Port Cities"
 Music Nova Scotia Award Winner Best Group Album - "Port Cities"
 Music Nova Scotia Award Winner Best Pop Album - "Port Cities"
 Music Nova Scotia Award Winner Entertainer of the Year
 Music Nova Scotia Award Winner Digital Artist of the Year
 Music Nova Scotia Award Nominee Video of the Year - "Trouble" (With Dave Sampson)
 SOCAN #1 Award - Back to the Bottom
 #1 CBC Radio Top 20 (February 23, 2017) - Back to the Bottom
 #1 Spotify Canada “Viral 50” Chart - Back to the Bottom
 Voted The Coast “Best of Halifax” -  Best Music Video - “Astronaut” (Gold)
 Voted The Coast “Best of Halifax” - Best Artist / Band Most Likely To Make It Big (Silver)
 Voted The Coast “Best of Halifax” - Best Pop Artist/Band (Silver)
2016
 Casino Nova Scotia Artist In Residence 2016 Winners
 Top 25 CBC Searchlight Competition
 Slaight Music Juno Masterclass Finalists
2015 
 Voted The Coast “Best of Halifax” - Best New Artist / Band (Bronze)

References

External links
 
 Port Cities on Spotify

Musical groups established in 2015
2015 establishments in Nova Scotia
Musical groups from Halifax, Nova Scotia
Canadian pop music groups